Suram Ali (also Romanized as Sūram ʿAlī) is a village in Mojezat Rural District, in the Central District of Zanjan County, Zanjan Province, Iran. At the 2006 census, its population was 48, in 13 families.

References 

Populated places in Zanjan County